Butch Miller may refer to:

Butch Miller (racing driver) (born 1952)
Butch Miller (wrestler) (born 1944), retired professional wrestler
Butch Miller (politician), state senator from Georgia (U.S. state)